Bayelsa is a state in the South South region of Nigeria, located in the core of the Niger Delta. Bayelsa State was created in 1996 and was carved out from Rivers State, making it one of the newest states in the federation. The capital, Yenagoa, is susceptible to high risk of annual flooding. It shares a boundary with Rivers State to the East and Delta State to the west, with the waters of the Atlantic Ocean dominating its southern borders. The state comprises eight local government areas: Ekeremor, Kolokuma/Opokuma, Yenagoa, Nembe, Ogbia, Sagbama, Brass and Southern Ijaw. The state is the smallest in Nigeria by population as of the 2006 census, as well as one of the smallest by area. Being in the Niger Delta, Bayelsa State has a riverine and estuarine setting, with bodies of water within the state preventing the development of significant road infrastructure.

The languages of the Ijaw are widely spoken in Bayelsa State, along with Isoko and Urhobo. The state is also the ancestral home of the Urhobo people in the Sagbama local government area.

As a state in the oil-rich Niger Delta, Bayelsa State's economy is dominated by the petroleum industry. The state is the site of Oloibiri Oilfield, where oil was first discovered in Nigeria, and as of 2015 was estimated to produce 30-40% of the country's oil. The state has the largest gas reservoir (18 trillion cubic feet) in Nigeria. Though being the site of one of the largest crude oil and natural gas deposits in the country contributes to local economic development, the state remains plagued by rampant poverty as well as pollution stemming from oil spills.

, Douye Diri is the governor of Bayelsa State, while Lawrence Ewhrudjakpo is the deputy governor.

History 
During the 20th century, demands for a new, majority-Ijaw state to be drawn in the Niger Delta Region became common. Between 1941 and 1956, numerous Ijaw nationalist organizations supportive of an Ijaw-majority state in Southern Nigeria were founded. Isaac Adaka Boro, a prominent Ijaw rights activist during the 1960's who was born in Oloibiri, attempted to proclaim a "Niger Delta Peoples Republic" in 1966. Bayelsa State was created out of Rivers State on October 1, 1996 by the Sani Abacha's military government. Its name was derived from the first few letters of the names of the major local government areas from which it was formed: Brass LGA (BALGA), Yenagoa LGA (YELGA) and Sagbama LGA (SALGA).

On November 20, 1999, the Nigerian military committed what is now referred to as the Odi massacre. The death toll remains disputed to this day, though Nnimmo Bassey, Executive Director of Environmental Rights Action, claims that nearly 2500 civilians were killed.

In response to environmental degradation in the state caused by the oil industry, movements such as the "Rise for Bayelsa" campaign have emerged to push for protecting the local water supply. In 2019, the Bayelsa State government launched the first formal inquiry into the crisis of oil pollution in the state.

Economy 
Bayelsa State has one of the largest crude oil and natural gas deposits in Nigeria. As a result, petroleum production is substantial in the state. Even though Bayelsa State is well-endowed with natural resources, the state "enjoys very minimal dividends from its oil wealth due to the structural inequities in the national revenue allocation system in the practice of fiscal federalism in the country".

Geography 

Bayelsa has a riverine and estuarine setting. Many communities are almost (and in some cases) surrounded by water, making them inaccessible by road. The state is home to the Edumanom Forest Reserve, in June 2008 the last known site for chimpanzees in the Niger Delta.

Other important cities besides Yenagoa include Akassa, Lobia, Amassoma (the home of the Niger Delta University), Eniwari, Ekeremor, Aliebiri, Peretoru, Twon-Brass, Egwema-Brass, Kaiama, Nembe, Odi, Ogbia, Okpoama, Brass, Oporoma, Korokorosei, Otuan, Koroama, Okolobiri, Obunagha, Ogboloma, Sagbama, Olugbobiri, Peremabiri, Ekowe, and Swali.

The Akassa Lighthouse has stood since 1910.

Natural resources 
Bayelsa State's natural resources include:

Mineral raw materials 
 Natural Gas
 Crude oil
 Salt

Agro raw materials 

 Cassava
 Coco-yam
 Plantain
 Timber
 Maize
 Rice
 Yam
 Sugar-cane
 Oil Palm

Languages
The main language spoken is Ijaw with dialects such as Kolokuma, Nembe, Epie-Atissa, and Ogbia. Like the rest of Nigeria, English is the official language.

Languages of Bayelsa State listed by LGA:

Environmental issues

Soot pollution 
This is a black hazardous carbonate substance that pollute the area due to its illegal burning of crude oil(locally called Kpo-fire). This carcinogenic chemical causes illnesses such as lung cancer, skin irritation, allergies, respiratory tract infections, eye problem etc. Its effect is also meted on the environment as it causes air pollution, soil pollution, water pollution which has led to the death of both plants, humans and animals.

Flooding 
This is a common annual problem in Bayelsa because it is located on the coast of the Atlantic Ocean. The rise of sea water is the major cause. The flooding has affected many communities, properties and human lives. Almost all areas in Bayelsa state are affected by flooding but Ekeremor, Southern Ijaw, Sagbama, Kolokuma/Opokuma and Yenagoa areas of Bayelsa state are more prone to flooding as it affects these areas yearly. Poor town planning is another major causes of flooding in Bayelsa State.

As of August 2022 the state was stricken with  flood, resulting to the displacement of over 1.3 million people destroying live stocks and properties.

Oil spillage 
This is one of the major environmental issue in Bayelsa State due to the activities of major oil companies. Oil spillage has affected farmlands, aquatic life and the health of the people. Almost everyday, Udengs Eradiri is informed of another oil spill in Bayelsa state, in the Niger Delta.

He said Bayelsa used to be green, you could go to farm or fish and have a very impressive harvest. You would spend just some hours in the water and you have a handful of fish. Today, he added, you can spend the whole day without catching a glimpse of a fish.

Another major environmental issue in Bayelsa state is air pollution(SOOT). Today, many people in Bayelsa state lament that they cannot breathe due to the exposure of emissions of soot, a hazardous black amorphous carbon that has almost completely polluted the air in the areas.

However, stakeholders in the affected areas had in 2018 reportedly initiated a campaign with the common refrain; "Save Rivers from this soot of death", in the Rivers state region.

Notable people 

 Diepreye Alamieyeseigha, was a former Nigerian politician and Governor of Bayelsa State
 Diezani Alison-Madueke, Minister of Solid Minerals, Transport and Petroleum resources
 MC Aproko, stand-up comedian
Owoye Andrew Azazi, Chief of Army Staff (Nigeria),  Chief of Defense Staff under President Olusegun Obasanjo and National Security Adviser under President Goodluck Jonathan.
Noah Sarenren Bazee a professional footballer who plays for Bundesliga side Hannover 96.
 Isaac Adaka Boro, Nigerian Civil War hero (Nigerian Army)
 Timi Dakolo, musical artist
 Edmund Daukoru, Nigerian Minister of State for Energy and was Secretary General of the Organization of the Petroleum Exporting Countries in 2006, HRM
Henry Seriake Dickson, former governor and politician 
 Alfred Diete-Spiff, former governor of Rivers State, HRM
Senator Douye Diri is a businessman, politician and lawmaker. He is the current governor of Bayelsa State.
Tamara Eteimo also known by her stage name Tamara from Angiama, Southern Ijaw local government of Bayelsa state. She is a Nigerian R&B singer-songwriter and actress.
 Dan Etete Minister Minister Petroleum resources
 Finidi George, Super Eagles player
 Daniel Igali, Canadian Olympic gold medalist and world wrestling champion
 Ernest Ikoli, journalist and pre-independence freedom fighter
 Goodluck Jonathan, former President of Nigeria
Heineken Lokpobiri, Minister of State for Agriculture
Senator Ben Murray-Bruce represents Bayelsa East Senatorial District at the National Assembly. From Akassa in Bayelsa State of Nigeria.
 Ebikibina Ogborodi, acting registrar of NECO
 Gabriel Okara, novelist and poet
 Melford Okilo, governor of Rivers State
Kemebradikumo Pondei, acting managing director of Niger Delta Development Commission
Ebinabo Potts-Johnson was born in Bayelsa state, she is a model and actress.
 Samson Siasia, Super Eagles player and Coach
 Timipre Sylva, former governor of Bayelsa state, current Nigeria Minister of State for Petroleum Resources.
 Timaya, musical artist
Patience Torlowei, fashion designer and artist

Diaspora
Due to massive overseas scholarship programs implemented by the old Rivers State in the 1970s and recent Bayelsa State governments, large numbers of Bayelsan professionals reside in Europe and North America. This is part of the general brain-drain trend affecting many African communities.

Education 
The major tertiary institutions in Bayelsa state are:

 Niger Delta University
 Isaac Jasper Boro College of Education
 College of Health Sciences
 School of Nursing
 Bayelsa State College of Arts and Science
 Bayelsa Medical University
 University of Africa
 Federal Polytechnic Ekeowe
 International Institute of Tourism and Hospitality
 Federal University Otuoke

Local Government Areas 

Bayelsa State consists of eight local government areas:

 Brass
 Ekeremor
 Kolokuma/Opokuma
 Nembe
 Ogbia
 Sagbama
 Southern Ijaw
 Yenagoa

Politics
The state government is led by a democratically elected governor who works closely with members of the state house of assembly. The Capital city of the state is Yenogoa.

Electoral System
The electoral system of Bayelsa state is selected using a modified two-round system. To be elected in the first round, a candidate must receive the plurality of the vote and over 25% of the vote in at least two -third of the State local government Areas. If no candidate passes threshold, a second round will be held between the top candidate and the next candidate to have received a plurality of votes in the highest number of local government Areas.

References

External links 

Bayelsa State Government Homepage
Bayelsa State at OnlineNigeria.com
Experience Bayelsa Arts and Culture / Visitors Guide
Bayelsa Council for Arts & Culture
Adaka Boro Centre 
Azaiki Public Library, Yenagoa

 
States of Nigeria
States and territories established in 1996
1996 establishments in Nigeria